Trichlorobenzene (TCB) may refer to any of three isomeric chlorinated derivatives of benzene with the molecular formula C6H3Cl3. Trichlorobenzenes are man-made chemical compounds that occur in three different forms. Even though the forms have the same molecular weight and molecular formulae, they are structurally different by the positions of the chlorine atoms attached to the benzene ring. 1,2,3-Trichlorobenzene and 1,3,5-trichlorobenzene are colorless solids, but 1,2,4-trichlorobenzene is a colorless oil. The isomers may also have different chemical and toxicological properties.

Identification numbers and regulations 
 1,2,3-Trichlorobenzene - EC number 201-757-1, CAS number 87-61-6, substance subjected to REACH Registration, added to the list of  Submitted SVHC Intentions List
 1,2,4-Trichlorobenzene - EC number  204-428-0, CAS number 120-82-1, substance subjected to REACH Registration, on 2 Aug 2010. added to the list of Submitted SVHC Intentions List on 2 Aug 2010.
 1,3,5-Trichlorobenzene - EC number 203-608-6, CAS 108-70-3, added to the list of Submitted SVHC Intentions List on 2 Aug 2010.

References

Chlorobenzenes